Sometimes I Sit and Think, and Sometimes I Just Sit is the debut studio album by Australian indie rock musician Courtney Barnett, released on 20 March 2015. The album received wide acclaim and was ranked as one of the best albums of 2015 by numerous publications.

Background and recording
After playing with various bands in Melbourne, Barnett used money that she had borrowed from her grandmother to start her own Milk Records label and released her first EP, I've Got a Friend Called Emily Ferris (2012). Following that release, Barnett signed to Marathon Artists (via its House Anxiety imprint). In August 2013, Marathon Artists released The Double EP: A Sea of Split Peas, packaging the first EP with Barnett's second, How To Carve A Carrot into a Rose.  The Double EP brought Barnett international critical acclaim, with the lead single, "Avant Gardener", named 'Best New Track' by Pitchfork in 2013.
How To Carve A Carrot was released on a limited run by Milk! Records as a standalone EP in October 2013.
In 2014, Marathon Artists partnered with Mom + Pop Music for the US release of The Double EP.

Barnett had spent a year writing songs for her album but only showed them to her band a week before they were recorded in order to capture a "fresh" sound. The song "Pedestrian at Best" was written "at the last minute" and the recorded version was the first time that Barnett had sung the words out loud. The album was largely recorded over eight days in Melbourne in April 2014 but the release was delayed due to touring commitments. Some early promo copies were distributed in Europe in mid-December 2014, and Barnett unveiled the album at the 2015 South by Southwest music festival in March and then embarked on a world tour beginning in Paris.

In the liner notes, Barnett reveals that the album's title was inspired by a poster that hung in her grandmother's bathroom.  It is also used as part of the lyrics of the hidden/bonus song "Stair Androids & Valley Um..." (see Track Listing section, below).

Critical reception 

Sometimes I Sit and Think, and Sometimes I Just Sit received widespread acclaim from music critics. At Metacritic, which assigns a normalised rating out of 100 to reviews from mainstream critics, the album received an average score of 88, based on 35 reviews. In a review for AllMusic, Stephen Thomas Erlewine called it "invigorating", saying that it provided a "convincing argument that rock & roll doesn't need reinvention in order to revive itself." Mike Powell of Pitchfork awarded the album a 'Best New Music' accolade, saying that "Barnett has nothing to prove and she's proving it." DIY magazine's Jamie Milton called the record "exceptional" and said "make no mistake - this is a debut like few others." Eric R. Danton, reviewing the album for Paste magazine, said that Sometimes I Sit and Think, and Sometimes I Just Sit was "one of the most compulsively listenable albums to come out so far this year." Everett True wrote in The Guardian that the album improves upon each listen because "it's been a while since western rock music – let alone Melbourne's fiercely insular and often too-precious indie scene – has thrown up a songwriter and lyricist as intriguing, compelling and down-to-earth, yet surreal and morbidly funny, as Barnett." In Cuepoint, Robert Christgau said Barnett's music has a "drive and focus" it did not have before, complemented by her passionate singing and a lyrical style reminiscent of John Prine and Jens Lekman but still "herself": "Formally, her songs are confessional, only they describe her material life and conflicted feelings acutely rather than dreamily, so that the songs occur in and are inflected by a deftly rendered physical and social world."

In a less enthusiastic review, Christopher Monk of musicOMH called Sometimes I Sit and Think, and Sometimes I Just Sit "a likeable, enjoyable album rather than a great one", writing that "the craft of Barnett's words dwarfs that of her music...there are too many compositions here that feel underwritten."

Rolling Stone ranked "Pedestrian at Best" at number 4 on its annual year-end list to find the best songs of 2015.

Accolades
Sometimes I Sit and Think, And Sometimes I Just Sit received eight nominations at the ARIA Music Awards of 2015, including for Album of the Year, Best Rock Album and Best Independent Release. On 7 October, Barnett won the ARIA Award for Best Cover Art, part of the artisan  ARIA awards, for her self drawn cover. On 26 November, Barnett also won Best Female Artist, Breakthrough Artist and Best Independent Release. She lost to Tame Impala's Currents for Album of the Year and Best Rock Album. Barnett was nominated for Best New Artist at the 2016 Grammy Awards.

Barnett was announced as the winner of the 2015 Australian Music Prize award which is given for the best Australian album release of the year.

At the J Awards of 2015, the album won Australian Album of the Year.

Track listing

Personnel
Credits are adapted from liner notes of Sometimes I Sit and Think, and Sometimes I Just Sit.

Musicians
Courtney Barnett – guitar, vocals
Dave Mudie – drums, percussion, vocals
Bones Sloane – bass, vocals
Dan Luscombe – guitar, vocals

Production
Courtney Barnett – production, artwork
Burke Reid – production, engineering, mixing
Dan Luscombe – production, mixing
Guy Davie – mastering
Tajette O'Halloran – photography

Charts

Weekly charts

Year-end charts

Certifications

References

External links 

2015 debut albums
ARIA Award-winning albums
Mom + Pop Music albums
Courtney Barnett albums
Albums produced by Burke Reid
Marathon Artists albums